The 2008 Austrian Figure Skating Championships took place between 14 and 16 December 2007 in Sankt Pölten. Skaters competed in the disciplines of men's singles, ladies' singles, and ice dancing. The results were used to choose the Austrian teams to the 2008 World Championships and the 2008 European Championships.

Senior results

Men

Ladies

Ice dancing

External links
 results

Austrian Figure Skating Championships
2007 in figure skating
Austrian Figure Skating Championships, 2008
Figure skating